Elisha Jessop (1843 – October 24, 1918) was a Canadian doctor and politician.

Born in Norfolk County, England, Jessop emigrated to Canada with his family in 1849.  They settled in the small rural community of Reach, Ontario.  He was educated in various rural schools before graduating from the Toronto Normal School in 1864.  After working as a teacher in several smaller communities, Jessop entered the University of Toronto, graduating in 1870.  He immediately enrolled in the University's medical school, and graduated as a medical doctor in 1875.  Jessop set up a practice in the town of Jordan, Ontario.  After a decade there, he returned to England for further studies, eventually returning to Canada and settling in St. Catharines in 1887.

In 1898, at the age of 55, Jessop entered Ontario politics, successfully standing as the Conservative candidate for the riding of Lincoln.  This began a twenty-year political career of which twelve were spent as a member of the Legislative Assembly of Ontario.

Jessop died of heart problems while still in office and is buried at Victoria Lawn Cemetery in St. Catharines.

External links 
Member's parliamentary history for the Legislative Assembly of Ontario
Obituary from The St. Catharines Standard, October 25, 1918

1843 births
1918 deaths
Progressive Conservative Party of Ontario MPPs
English emigrants to pre-Confederation Ontario